Coulon may refer to:

 Coulon (surname)
 Coulon, alternative name for the river Calavon, in the Vaucluse department, France
 Coulon, Deux-Sèvres, a commune of the Deux-Sèvres department, France
 Coulon, former commune of the Cher department, now part of Graçay
 Coulon, former commune of the Ille-et-Vilaine department, now part of Montfort-sur-Meu